Zubaida Gulshan Ara ( – 19 March 2017) was a Bangladeshi writer. She was the chairperson of Bangladesh Shishu Academy. She was awarded Ekushey Padak in 2005 by the Government of Bangladesh.

Career
Ara wrote 50 books. She served as the general secretary of "Sahitto Bangladesh", a literary organization.

References

1940s births
2017 deaths
Bangladeshi women writers
Recipients of the Ekushey Padak
Year of birth missing
Burials at Banani Graveyard